Esp Stadium is a stadium in Fislisbach, Switzerland.  It is currently used for football matches and is the home ground of FC Baden. The stadium is situated a few kilometres outside of Baden in Canton Aargau. The capacity of the stadium is 7,000, of which 1,000 is seating and the rest is terracing.

References

Football venues in Switzerland
FC Baden